Gawain Christopher Bernard Jones (born 11 December 1987) is an English chess player. He was awarded the title of Grandmaster by FIDE in 2007. He won the British Chess Championship in 2012 and 2017. He competed in the FIDE World Cup in 2013, 2017 and 2019.

Career
Jones began playing chess at the age of four, competing in his first tournaments at six. In early 1997 he hit the headlines and was featured on the front page of The Guardian newspaper when he became the youngest player in the world ever to beat an International Master in an official tournament game. He has represented England in the World Junior and World Youth Championships on many occasions and since 2008 has been one of England's highest rated players.

An active player on the tournament circuit, he secured his Grandmaster title with successful results at the 2nd EU Individual Open Championship in Liverpool in 2006, 2006 European Club Cup in Fügen and 4NCL 2006/7 season. Elsewhere in Europe, he took first place at Porto San Giorgio and La Laguna (both 2007). During his stay in Australasia, there were many more tournament successes, including a share of first place at the Sydney International 2008 and creditable second places at the Doeberl Cup 2008 and Queenstown Classic 2009.

Jones shared first place with Simon Williams at the London Chess Classic FIDE Open 2010. In 2011, he won the Bunratty Masters, ahead of Nigel Short, whom he defeated in their individual encounter, and the Commonwealth Chess Championship in Ekurhuleni. Jones won the 2012/13 Hastings International Chess Congress as clear first.

In December 2014, he won the Challenge Match against Romain Édouard by 4–2; it was a six-game match held concurrently with the London Chess Classic. In 2016, Jones won the New Zealand Open in January, and the Dubai Open in April edging out Vladimir Akopian on tiebreak. The next year he won at Dubai for the second time, becoming the first player to do so. Jones edged out this time Mustafa Yilmaz, Vidit Gujrathi, Eduardo Iturrizaga, Ahmed Adly, Sergei Zhigalko and Aleksandr Rakhmanov on tiebreak score.

In team competitions, Jones has played for England in the Chess Olympiad, the World Team Chess Championship, the European Team Chess Championship and the World Youth Under 16 Chess Olympiad. At the 2019 World Team Championship in Astana, England took the silver medal and Jones also won an individual silver playing on board four.

Books

Personal life
Born in Keighley, West Yorkshire, Jones has lived in Italy, Ireland, Australia and New Zealand. In 2010, he returned to the United Kingdom to live in London in order to focus on his chess career and related projects.

Jones is married to Sue Maroroa, also a chess player.

References

External links
 
 
 
 
 
 

1987 births
Living people
Sportspeople from Keighley
English chess players
English sportswriters
British chess writers
Chess grandmasters
Chess Olympiad competitors